Travis Hannah (born January 31, 1971, in Hawthorne, California) is a former American football wide receiver in the National Football League.

Professional career
Hannah was drafted with the 102nd pick in the 4th round of the 1993 NFL Draft by the Houston Oilers where he played between 1993 and 1995.  He was selected by the Jacksonville Jaguars in the 1995 NFL Expansion Draft.  He later played for the Arena Football League Los Angeles Avengers.

College career
Hannah graduated from USC.

High school career
Hannah prepped at Hawthorne High School. Hannah was a top 400 meter sprinter and was the California CIF State Champion in 1988 with a time of 47.20.  See the race.  He also anchored his team to a dominating 5 second victory in the 4x400 meters relay.  See the race.  The year before, Hannah came from far off the pace to finish second to Steve Lewis in a hand timed 47.2.  See the race.  In 1988, Lewis became the Olympic Champion.

References

External links
NFL stats
AFL stats

1971 births
Living people
Sportspeople from Hawthorne, California
American football wide receivers
USC Trojans football players
Houston Oilers players
Jacksonville Jaguars players
Frankfurt Galaxy players
Los Angeles Avengers players